Elen may refer to:

Elen (saint), a Welsh saint
Elen ferch Llywelyn (c. 1206–1253)
Elen Dosia, a French opera singer
Elen Levon, a Ukrainian singer, actress and dancer
Elen Shakirova, a Russian former basketball player
Elen Willard (born 1935), an American actress
European Language Equality Network, a European NGO to promote linguistic diversity

See also
Ellen (disambiguation)

Welsh feminine given names